Shaun Sipos (born October 30, 1981) is a Canadian actor, known for playing Jack on the ABC series Complete Savages, Eric Daniels on Life Unexpected, David Breck on The CW series Melrose Place, Aaron Whitmore on The CW's The Vampire Diaries, and Adam Strange on Syfy's Krypton.

Life and career
Sipos was born in Victoria, British Columbia, and is of ethnic Hungarian descent from Croatia. He is the older brother of actress Jessica Sipos. On December 29, 2020 it was announced that he had become engaged to his girlfriend, actress Lindsey Morgan.

Sipos' television credits include a series regular role on the sitcom Maybe It's Me, guest starring roles on Smallville, Black Sash, ER, and CSI: Miami, and a supporting role on Special Unit 2. His feature film credits include Final Destination 2, The Skulls III, Superbabies: Baby Geniuses 2, Comeback Season, The Grudge 2, and Lost Boys: The Tribe. In 2009, Sipos was cast as David Breck in The CW's Melrose Place, a reboot of the 1990s Fox primetime soap opera of the same name.

Sipos appeared in the series Life Unexpected as a teacher who becomes a love interest of the main character, Lux.

He played a regular role on Syfy's space fantasy Dark Matter as Devon Taltherd.

Filmography

References

External links
 
 
 Shaun Sipos at The CW

1981 births
21st-century Canadian male actors
Canadian emigrants to the United States
Canadian expatriate male actors in the United States
Canadian male film actors
Canadian male television actors
Canadian people of Croatian descent
Living people
Male actors from Victoria, British Columbia
Canadian people of Hungarian descent